The Telecommunication Technology Committee (TTC) is a standardization organization established in 1985 and authorized by Japan's Ministry of Internal Affairs and Communications to conduct research and to develop and promote standards for telecommunications in Japan.

The TTC is a founding partner organization of the Global Standards Collaboration initiative and an organizational partner of the 3rd Generation Partnership Project (3GPP).

External links
http://www.ttc.or.jp/e/index.html Telecommunication Technology Committee website

Telecommunications in Japan
Mass media companies
Companies established in 1985
1985 establishments in Japan